Sphenomorphus tenuiculus  is a species of skink found in Malaysia and Indonesia.

References

tenuiculus
Reptiles described in 1890
Taxa named by François Mocquard
Reptiles of Borneo